Something Different is the third studio album by Sidewalk Prophets. Fervent Records alongside Word Records released the album on August 28, 2015. Sidewalk Prophets worked with Seth Mosley, in the production of this album.

Critical reception

Awarding the album four stars at CCM Magazine, Jamie Walker states, "Something Different, successfully marks the bands foray into their new era of sound." Caitlin Lassiter, giving the album four and a half stars for New Release Today, writes, "Something Different is by far their best work yet and definitely raises the bar for other artists." Rating the album three stars from Jesus Freak Hideout, Christopher Smith says, "These few stronger cuts aren't enough to carry the album, so in the end, Something Different is a collection of mostly standard but likable CCM tunes. This album will churn out a few solid radio hits, but as a whole, it is lacking in artistic vision and lyrical depth."

Joshua Andre, signaling in a four star review for 365 Days of Inspiring Media, recognizes, "Sidewalk Prophets and producer Seth Mosley have crafted an album with most songs fit for the radio and littered with biblical truths." Indicating in a 4.8 out of five review by Christian Music Review, Brian Hunter describes, "[he] enjoyed this album very much and [he's] sure you will as well." Sarah Baylor, specifying in a perfect five review at The Christian Beat, replies, "Each song is a stand alone hit single waiting to happen...Never have I heard such an accomplished album or an album more deserving of a 5/5 rating."

Track listing

Charts

References

2015 albums
Word Records albums
Fervent Records albums